Pavel Trofimovich Konovalov (Russian: Павел Трофимович Коновалов; born 13 November 1960) is a retired Soviet sprinter who specialised in the 400 metres. Individually, his biggest achievement is a gold medal at the 1982 European Indoor Championships. In addition, he won a bronze medal in the 4 × 400 metres relay at the 1982 European Championships and silver at the 1979 European Junior Championships.

His personal bests in the event are 45.84 seconds outdoors (Athens 1982) and 46.87 seconds indoors (Milan 1982).

International competitions

References

1960 births
Living people
Russian male sprinters
Soviet male sprinters
Sportspeople from Rostov Oblast